The 1896 United States presidential election in Alabama took place on November 3, 1896. All contemporary 45 states were part of the 1896 United States presidential election. Alabama voters chose eleven electors to the Electoral College, which selected the president and vice president.

Alabama was won by the Democratic nominees, former U.S. Representative William Jennings Bryan of Nebraska and his running mate Arthur Sewall of Maine. Despite losing by more than a two-to-one margin, this would prove the last time a Republican won Colbert County until Richard Nixon in 1972.

Results

Results by county

See also
United States presidential elections in Alabama

Notes

References

Alabama
1896
1896 Alabama elections